Isaacs is a surname. Notable people with the surname include:

 Alick Isaacs, Scottish virologist
 Avrom Isaacs, Canadian art dealer
 Bertha Isaacs, Bahamian tennis player and women's rights activist
 Charles Edward Isaacs (1811–1860), American anatomist and physiologist
 David Isaacs (writer), American screenwriter
 Don Isaacs (1919–1998), American sound editor
 Erwin Isaacs, South African football  player
 George Isaacs, English politician and trade unionist
 Gregory Isaacs, Jamaican reggae musician
 Ike Isaacs (1923-1981),  American jazz bassist
 Ike Isaacs (1919-1996), Burmese-British jazz guitarist
 Iorrie Isaacs, Wales rugby player
 Isaac Isaacs, Australian politician, jurist and Governor-General
 Jason Isaacs, English actor
 Jeremy Isaacs, Scottish television producer and executive
 John Isaacs, African-American basketball player
 John Dove Isaacs, American oceanic scientist
 Jorge Isaacs, Colombian writer, politician and soldier
 Kendal Isaacs, Bahamian politician and Leader of the Opposition
 Levi Isaacs (1860–1913), Australian tobacconist and Jewish lay leader
 Lewis Henry Isaacs, English architect, surveyor, and politician
 Mark Isaacs, Australian composer and pianist
 Nathaniel Isaacs, English adventurer
 Pamela Isaacs, American actress and singer
 Rufus Isaacs, 1st Marquess of Reading, English politician and jurist
 Rufus Isaacs (game theorist), American mathematician
 Sam Isaacs, Australian Aboriginal stockman
 Samuel Myer Isaacs, American educator
 Sonya Isaacs, American country singer
 Stan Isaacs, American sportswriter
 Susan Isaacs, American novelist and screenwriter
 Susan Sutherland Isaacs, English educational psychologist and psychoanalyst
 Susie Isaacs, American poker player

Fictional characters
 Jeff Isaacs, from Degrassi: The Next Generation
 Doctor Sam Isaacs, from Resident Evil (film series)
 Toby Isaacs, from Degrassi: The Next Generation
 Melanie Isaacs from Disgrace

Patronymic surnames
Surnames from given names